Bear Island is one of the Apostle Islands of northern Wisconsin in Lake Superior, and is part of the Apostle Islands National Lakeshore.  Unlike nearby Madeline Island, it is not open to commercial development. There is another Bear Island in Balsam Lake.

Notes

Apostle Islands
Islands of Ashland County, Wisconsin